Marika (born Marta Kosakowska on 14 December 1980) is a Polish vocalist, songwriter and radio DJ. Currently performing avant-pop, she was previously known for her Caribbean-inspired repertoire which incorporated reggae, dancehall, as well as funk and soul music. She was hailed "the First Lady of Polish dancehall" and was noted for energetic shows and conscious lyrics. She also had a short-lived but successful career as a prime time TV host in Poland.

Career
Marika was born in Białystok, but grew up in the nearby Łomża. She studied Polonistics at the Adam Mickiewicz University in Poznań.

She debuted in 2002 as the vocalist of the sound system Bass Medium Trinity. The group released the album Mówisz i masz (Polish for You Say and You Have) in 2004, which was the first Polish-language album recorded on original Jamaican riddims. At the same time, Marika was a member of the band Breakbeat Propaganda. In 2005, she was performing as a soloist in a theatre project 12 ławek (12 Benches) in Gdynia, and supported Macy Gray during her concert in Warsaw's Congress Hall. In 2006, Marika participated in a Polish-German musical project Polski ogień (Polish Fire), for which she recorded two songs: "Siła ognia" (on "Doctor's Darling" riddim) and "What's Ya Flava" (on "Curefix" riddim).

In 2007, Marika released her debut solo single, "Moje serce" ("My Heart"), through Karrot Kommando. She then signed with Pomaton EMI and released her first solo album, Plenty, on 22 August 2008. It reached the top 20 in the Polish albums chart and met with favorable reviews. In October, she started hosting her own radio show called Nie tylko reggae (Not Only Reggae) on Radio Euro. The following year, Plenty was nominated for the Polish music award Fryderyk in the Hip-Hop/R&B Album of the Year category, and Marika received a nomination in the New Face of Phonography category. In the summer of 2009, the English-language track "So Sure" was released as the final single from Plenty, followed by an EP titled So Remixed, which featured a selection of remixes. In September 2009, Marika started another radio show, Towary kolonialne, on Roxy FM.

On 8 June 2010, Marika released her second studio album titled Put Your Shoes On/Off. It consisted of two CDs: one with new material and another one with remixes. The first single from the album was "Uplifter". The album was another top 20 success and received positive reviews. On 4 July 2010, she performed in the same line-up with Nas and Damian Marley at the Open'er Festival in Gdynia. Put Your Shoes On/Off was nominated for the Fryderyk award in the Album of the Year - Hip-Hop/R&B/Reggae category. In mid-2011, Marika released a music video for the multilingual song "Esta Festa" (Portuguese for "It's a Party") in which she sings in Polish, English and Portuguese.

In 2012, she appeared on the compilation Morowe panny which was released to commemorate the Warsaw Uprising. In October 2012, Marika released her third album, Momenty, recorded with the band Spokoarmia. It spawned the popular songs "Baqaa" and "Widok". In May 2013, she released Chilli Zet Live Sessions, an album consisting of acoustic versions of songs from her previous CDs. From 2013 to mid-2014, she co-hosted three seasons of The Voice of Poland broadcast on TVP2, the Polish edition of the singing talent show The Voice. In autumn 2014, she so-hosted the show SuperSTARcie also on TVP2. In the meantime, she took part in two more historical projects, Panny wyklęte and Panny wyklęte: wygnane vol. 1.

On her next album, titled simply Marta Kosakowska, the singer shifted from reggae and dancehall towards electronic avant-pop. Released in October 2015, the album was preceded by the singles "Tabletki" and "A jeśli to ja", and was accompanied by Marika's radical change of image. It received positive reviews and charted within the top 40 in Poland. In 2016, she released the book Antydepresanty which consisted of lyrics, stories and black-and-white illustrations. She began recording the new album in 2017, and the following year released a remix of "Moje serce" to mark the 10th anniversary of the release of her debut album. The singer then focused on family life, but continued to perform regularly, and returned with the single "Jak na moje oko" in May 2020.

Private life
Marika divorced her first husband around the beginning of her solo career. She married her second husband in March 2016 and gave birth to their twin boys in early 2018.

At the turn of 2014 and 2015, Marika went through a spiritual awakening and started practicing Catholicism. She does, however, define herself as a "person of faith" rather than "religious".

She is a vegetarian.

Marika advocates the legalization of cannabis.

Discography

Studio albums

Singles

References

External links

 Official website
 Official YouTube channel
 Marika on Discogs

1980 births
21st-century Polish singers
21st-century Polish women singers
Dancehall singers
English-language singers from Poland
Living people
People from Białystok
Polish reggae singers
Polish Roman Catholics
Polish singer-songwriters
Artists from Białystok